Azerbaijani Americans are Americans of the Azerbaijani ancestry from the Republic of Azerbaijan and Iranian Azerbaijan or people possessing Azerbaijani, Iranian, and/or American citizenship. Most Azerbaijani Americans have immigrated to the United States from Azerbaijan, Iran, Germany, Georgia, Russia, Turkey and Ukraine.

History

The first major wave of Azerbaijanis came to the U.S. in 1940s and 1950s, as many Azerbaijani émigrés and POWs left the Soviet Union and Iran during and after World War II. Among those were also a number of expatriates, who fled to Turkey, Iran or parts of Europe upon the Soviet occupation of Azerbaijan in 1920, and in 1950s and 1960s, moved to the United States in pursuit of better economic opportunities. This wave of Azerbaijani immigrants settled mainly in New York City and its metropolitan area, which hosts the largest population of Azerbaijani-Americans, in Northern New Jersey and Massachusetts; and later in Florida, Texas, and California, especially in Los Angeles area where there is a large Iranian community, many of whom are Iranian Azerbaijanis. In 1957, a group of these Azerbaijani settlers in New Jersey founded the Azerbaijan Society of America, a first Azerbaijani-American community organization. By 1980 there were around 200 families that identified themselves as Azerbaijani in the United States, with about 80% of them being endogamic. In 1976, Houston and Baku established the first sister-city association between the cities in the U.S. and Azerbaijan. It was followed with a sister city between Honolulu, Hawaii and Baku in 1988, Newark, New Jersey and Ganja (second largest city in Azerbaijan) in the early 2000s (decade), and Monterey, California and Lankaran in 2011.

Demographics

According to the 2000 U.S. census, there were an estimated 14,205 Americans born in Azerbaijan, out of which 5,530 were naturalized U.S. Citizens and 5,553 identified themselves as Azerbaijani of either primary or secondary ancestry. Census 2000 did not count Azerbaijani-Americans born in countries other than Azerbaijan.

According to the Department of Homeland Security (DHS), in 2001–2010, a total of 9,391 people from Azerbaijan were naturalized as U.S. citizens. The table here presents the distribution for each year between 2001 and 2010.

These statistics do not include the legal permanent residents (green card holders) who numbered 781 in 2010, refugees, legal non-immigrant aliens (temporary visitors) who numbered 4,938 in 2009, as well as a very large number of ethnic Azerbaijanis born in other countries, such as Iran, Russia and Turkey. Thus, based only on Census 2000 and DHS data, the official estimate of the U.S. citizens born in Azerbaijan is approximately 14,944, and the number of U.S. residents born in Azerbaijan is approximately 24,377, minus the natural decline.

According to the U.S. Census 2000 data, the Azerbaijanis who immigrated from Azerbaijan have settled primarily in New York (12,540), New Jersey (4,357), Texas (3,178), California (2,743), and Minnesota (1,559). There is also a sizeable Mountain Jewish population in Brooklyn.

Socio-political activity
The first mention of the nascent Azerbaijani-Americans in the U.S. political life appears in the 1990 issue of The Economist. By the late 1990s, the Azerbaijani-Americans became more active in the American sociopolitical life, including the U.S. Congress, mainly advocating Azerbaijani interests in the Nagorno-Karabakh conflict. By 2002, the Azerbaijani-Americans became active enough to be mentioned in the speeches in the U.S. Congress. In 2004, a group of Congressmen founded the Congressional Azerbaijan Caucus in the U.S. House of Representatives. By 2011, the Azerbaijani-Americans have been honored in several U.S. legislative bills and resolutions.

Azerbaijani-themed parks, streets and monuments

The Azerbaijan Garden, a park, was dedicated on May 12, 2008, in Cleveland, Ohio. Khanlar Gasimov's sculpture "Hearth" stands at the center of the Garden. Made of polished stainless steel, the bowl-shaped sculpture allows viewers to see the reflection of the earth and sky in its exterior and interior curves. The Azerbaijani Garden is part of the Cleveland Cultural Gardens, which was opened in 1916, along Doan Brook in Cleveland's Rockefeller Park. The opening of the garden was celebrated by Congressman Dennis Kucinich.

TV, radio, media and newspapers
Gunaz TV (TV broadcast from Chicago via satellite and Internet, in Azerbaijani language only)
Azerbaijani Radio Hour (Weekly at Sunday noon radio on WUST 1120AM in Baltimore and Washington DC and via Internet, iTunes and RSS feed in English)
Azerbaijan International (Los Angeles based quarterly magazine published since 1993, in English)
Azerbaijan Review (monthly newspaper published in New York since 2007, in Azerbaijani, Russian and English)
Caspian Crossroads (Washington D.C.-based quarterly journal published since 1996, in English)

Notable people
 Sona Aslanova, Soviet and Azerbaijani soprano
 Semyon Bilmes, Azerbaijani-American painter 
 Max Black, philosopher, physicist, mathematician
 Sibel Edmonds, former Federal Bureau of Investigation translator and founder of the National Security Whistleblowers Coalition (NSWBC)
 Haydar Hatemi, Iranian artist
 Shireen Hunter, academic
 Rustam Ibragimbekov, Soviet-Azerbaijani screenwriter, dramatist and producer
 Ali Javan, professor of physics, inventor of gas laser, Massachusetts Institute of Technology
 Cihangir Ghaffari, Azerbaijani-born Iranian-American actor and producer 
 Ella Leya, composer, singer, and writer, born in Baku
 Hamid Mowlana, Iranian-American advisor to the Iranian President Mahmoud Ahmadinejad
 Spencer Nelson, basketball player for the Azerbaijani national team
 Stepan Pachikov, businessman
 Firouz Partovi, physicist
 Alec Rasizade, professor of history and political science
 Mstislav Rostropovich, conductor, cellist
 Chingiz Sadykhov, pianist from Azerbaijan
 Hassan Sattar, Iranian musician
 Zecharia Sitchin, Azerbaijani-born American author
 Sina Tamaddon, Senior Vice President of Applications for Apple Inc
 Behrouz Vossoughi, Iranian actor
 Norm Zada, founder of Perfect 10 magazine
 Lotfi A. Zadeh, mathematician, electrical engineer and computer scientist, University of California, Berkeley
 Tony Zarrindast, artist

See also

Azerbaijanis in France
Azerbaijanis in Germany
Azerbaijanis in the United Kingdom
Georgian Americans
Hyphenated American
Iranian Americans
Turkish Americans
Russian Americans
Azerbaijan–United States relations

References

Further reading
 Waitman, Grace. "Azerbaijani Americans." Gale Encyclopedia of Multicultural America, edited by Thomas Riggs, 3rd ed., vol. 1, Gale, 2014, pp. 203-210. online

American
Middle Eastern American